Saint Cadoc's Hospital is a mental health facility located in Caerleon on the northern outskirts of the city of Newport, Wales. It is managed by the Aneurin Bevan University Health Board.

History
The foundation stone for the hospital was laid in May 1903. It was designed by Alfred J. Wood using a compact arrow layout and was opened as the Newport Borough Asylum in January 1906. It became Newport County Borough Mental Hospital in 1919 and St. Cadoc's Emergency Hospital during the Second World War. It took its name from Saint Cadoc, patron saint of the local church. It joined the National Health Service as St Cadoc's Hospital in 1948. A new admission unit and outpatient clinic was completed in 1961.

In popular culture
St Cadoc's Hospital has been featured as a location of episodes in the BBC television programmes Doctor Who and Torchwood.

References

External links
ABUHB website

Hospital buildings completed in 1906
Hospitals in Newport, Wales
Hospitals established in 1906
Psychiatric hospitals in Wales
History of Newport, Wales
NHS hospitals in Wales
1906 establishments in Wales
Caerleon
Aneurin Bevan University Health Board